Amt Lieberose/Oberspreewald is an Amt ("collective municipality") in the district of Dahme-Spreewald, in Brandenburg, Germany. Its seat is in the town Lieberose.

The Amt Lieberose/Oberspreewald consists of the following municipalities:
Alt Zauche-Wußwerk
Byhleguhre-Byhlen
Jamlitz
Lieberose
Neu Zauche
Schwielochsee
Spreewaldheide
Straupitz

Demography

References

Lieberose
Dahme-Spreewald